Frontier Crusader is a 1940 American Western film directed by Sam Newfield and starring Tim McCoy, Dorothy Short and Lou Fulton.

Cast
 Tim McCoy as Trigger Tim Rand 
 Dorothy Short as Jenny Mason 
 Lou Fulton as 'Lanky' Lint 
 Karl Hackett as Barney Bronson 
 Ted Adams as Henchman Jack Trask 
 John Merton as Henchman Hippo Potts 
 Forrest Taylor as John Stoner 
 Hal Price as Sheriff Sam Dolan 
 Frank LaRue as Jeff Martin aka Lon Martin 
 Kenne Duncan as The Mesa Kid 
 George Chesebro as Trail Boss

References

Bibliography
 Darby, William. Masters of Lens and Light: A Checklist of Major Cinematographers and Their Feature Films. Scarecrow Press, 1991.

External links
 

1940 films
1940 Western (genre) films
American black-and-white films
American Western (genre) films
Films directed by Sam Newfield
Producers Releasing Corporation films
1940s English-language films
1940s American films